Check This Kid Out is a Disney Channel short series which premiered in June 2005, during Disney Channel's So Hot Summer! promotion. Narrated by Courtney Halverson and Carr Thompson, the show features short segments of teenagers, from across the country, who spotlight the jobs that they do. Toon Disney stopped airing the short series on February 12, 2009. The series was left on the air until December 2009, but it returned on March 26, 2012.

The kids
This season featured a combination slideshow / video format, featuring ideas of possible professions. This season featured these kids and their jobs:

The Check This Kid Out interstitials were originally cast with the help of Alyse Rome, founder and president of Amazing Kids! (www.amazing-kids.org), a children's educational non-profit organization and the number one online resource for stories about real-life amazing kids.  Alyse was hired as a consultant to help with the initial casting.

External links
 Amazing Kids! Official website
 

2000s American reality television series
2010s American reality television series
Disney Channel original programming
2005 American television series debuts
2009 American television series endings
2012 American television series debuts